Courage fuyons is a French romantic comedy film directed by Yves Robert.

Plot
Martin Belhomme is a coward since his birth, also home cowardice is passed from generation to generation. After a childhood spent in the tumult of the Occupation, he "is married" with Mathilda who will decide everything : they will have two children and he will become a pharmacist, even if he vowed a passion for music. But after this monotonous life, occurs in May 68, and cowardice will paradoxically lead him into a crazy adventure, far from home, with Eva, beautiful blonde singer in a cabaret of Amsterdam. Therefore, he will make every effort to seduce the beautiful, and pass for an adventurer to her eyes.

Cast

 Jean Rochefort as Martin Belhomme / Adrien Belhomme
 Catherine Deneuve as Eva
 Dominique Lavanant as Mathilda
 Philippe Leroy as Eric Sylvain de Chalamond
 Robert Webber as Charley
 Michel Aumont as Franckie
 Michel Beaune as Noël
 Christophe Bourseiller as Christophe
 Eliane Borras as Sylvette Goldoni
 Christian Charmetant as Pierre Martin
 Nathalie Mazeas as Monica
 Janine Souchon as Madame Berger
 Erick Desmarestz as Edmondson
 Philippe Le Mercier as Thierry
 Gérard Darmon as The provocative

Accolades

References

External links

1979 films
1979 romantic comedy films
French romantic comedy films
Films with screenplays by Jean-Loup Dabadie
Films scored by Vladimir Cosma
1970s French-language films
1970s French films